The Descartes-Huygens Prize is an yearly scientific prize created in 1995 by the French and the Dutch governments, and attributed to two scientists of international level, a French one chosen by the Koninklijke Nederlandse Akademie van Wetenschappen and a Dutch one chosen by the Académie des sciences, to reward their work and their contributions to the French-Dutch cooperation.

The prize is named in memory of French scientist René Descartes (1596–1650) and Dutch scientist Christiaan Huygens (1629–1695), who spent several years working in each other's country.

Attribution of the prize 
The prize consists of an amount of 46000 euros (€23000 for each recipient), contributed by the KNAW, the French Embassy in the Netherlands and the French Minister of Higher Education and Research. It is intended to finance one or more research visits in the Netherlands or in France. It is attributed by juries presided by one of the participating Academies (Koninklijke Nederlandse Akademie van Wetenschappen, Académie des sciences and Académie des sciences morales et politiques), alternating between the following disciplines: natural sciences, life sciences, human and social sciences.

List of the Dutch laureates 

 1995 - Jook Walraven, physicist
 1996 - H. Pannekoek
 1997 - Olga Weijers, literary scholar
 1998 - Wim van Saarloos, physicist
 1999 - Jan Hoeijmakers, geneticist
 2000 - Theo Verbeek, philosopher
 2001 - Pieter Timotheus (Tim) de Zeeuw, astronomer
 2002 - Harry Struijker-Boudier, pharmacologist
 2003 - not assigned to Dutch scientist
 2004 - , historian
 2005 - Anne-Jans Faber, physicist
 2006 - Albert Heck, chemist
 2007 - Pim den Boer, historian
 2008 - Stefan Vandoren, physicist
 2009 - Arthur Wilde, cardiovascular researcher
 2010 - , historian
 2011 - Ieke Moerdijk, mathematician
 2012 - Harry Heijnen, cell biologist
 2013 - Caroline van Eck, art historian
 2014 - Willem Vos, physicist
 2015 - Joost Gribnau, epigeneticist
 2016 - Louis Sicking, historian
 2017 - Daniël Vanmaekelbergh, material scientist
 2018 - Katell Lavéant, literary scholar
 2019 - , astronomer
2020 - Rampal Etienne, evolutionary ecologist
 2021 - Maike Hansen, biophysician

List of the French laureates 

 1995 - Michel Devoret, physicist
 1996 - Denis Escande
 1997 - Robert Muchembled, historian
 1998 - Philippe Sautet, chemist
 1999 - Philippe Devaux
 2000 - Virginie Guiraudon, political scientist
 2001 - Bernard Meunier, chemist
 2002 - , biologist
 2003 - Hamida Demirdache, linguist
 2004 - Marie-Paule Pileni, physical chemist
 2005 - not assigned to French scientist
 2006 - Hubert Vaudry, endocrinologist
 2007 - Catherine Secretan, philosopher
 2008 - Pierre Braunstein, chemist
 2009 - Marc Humbert, pulmonary researcher
 2010 - François Héran, social demographer
 2011 - François Hammer, astronomer
 2012 - , biologist
 2013 - Bénédicte Fauvarque-Cosson, jurist
 2014 - Ludwik Leibler, physicist
 2015 - Benoit Viollet, molecular physiologist
 2016 - Olivier l'Haridon, behavioural economist
 2017 - , physicist
 2018 - Marine Cotte, art conservation researcher
 2019 - Julien Barc, cardiovascular researcher
2020 - Halima Mouhib, physicist
 2021 - Charles-Édouard Levillain, historian

References 

Awards of the Royal Netherlands Academy of Arts and Sciences
Awards of the French Academy of Sciences
Dutch science and technology awards
French science and technology awards